The 1936 Brooklyn Dodgers fired manager Casey Stengel after another dismal campaign, which saw the team finish in 6th place.

Offseason 
 December 12, 1935: Tony Cuccinello, Al López, Ray Benge and Bobby Reis were traded to the Boston Bees for Ed Brandt and Randy Moore.
 February 6, 1936: Johnny Babich and Gene Moore were traded by the Dodgers to the Boston Bees for Fred Frankhouse.
 February 20, 1936: Sam Leslie was purchased from the Dodgers by the New York Giants.
 February 20, 1936: Johnny McCarthy, Buzz Boyle and cash were traded by the Dodgers to the New York Yankees for Buddy Hassett.
 March 31, 1936: Wally Millies was purchased from the Dodgers by the Washington Senators.

Regular season

Season standings

Record vs. opponents

Notable transactions 
 April 2, 1936: Wayne Osborne was purchased from the Dodgers by the Boston Bees.
 July 15, 1936: George Earnshaw was traded by the Dodgers to the St. Louis Cardinals for a player to be named later. The Cardinals completed the deal by sending Eddie Morgan to the Dodgers on October 1.
 August 1, 1936: The Dodgers traded players to be named later to the St. Louis Cardinals for Tom Winsett. The Dodgers completed the deal by sending Frenchy Bordagaray, Dutch Leonard and Jimmy Jordan to the Cardinals on December 3.

Roster

Player stats

Batting

Starters by position 
Note: Pos = Position; G = Games played; AB = At bats; H = Hits; Avg. = Batting average; HR = Home runs; RBI = Runs batted in

Other batters 
Note: G = Games played; AB = At bats; H = Hits; Avg. = Batting average; HR = Home runs; RBI = Runs batted in

Pitching

Starting pitchers 
Note: G = Games pitched; IP = Innings pitched; W = Wins; L = Losses; ERA = Earned run average; SO = Strikeouts

Other pitchers 
Note: G = Games pitched; IP = Innings pitched; W = Wins; L = Losses; ERA = Earned run average; SO = Strikeouts

Relief pitchers 
Note: G = Games pitched; W = Wins; L = Losses; SV = Saves; ERA = Earned run average; SO = Strikeouts

Awards and honors 
1936 Major League Baseball All-Star Game
Van Mungo reserve

Farm System 

LEAGUE CHAMPIONS: Davenport, Greenwood

Notes

References 
Baseball-Reference season page
Baseball Almanac season page

External links 
1936 Brooklyn Dodgers uniform
Brooklyn Dodgers reference site
Acme Dodgers page 
Retrosheet

Los Angeles Dodgers seasons
Brooklyn Dodgers season
Brooklyn
1930s in Brooklyn
Flatbush, Brooklyn